The Capital Beltway is the popular name for Interstate 495, the beltway around Washington, DC. It may also refer to:

 Capital Beltway (Amtrak station), a former train station located near I-495 in Lanham, Maryland
 Capital Beltway (Harrisburg) in Harrisburg, Pennsylvania 
 Atlanta Beltway around the capital of Georgia (Interstate 285)
 The Outerbelt around the capital of Ohio (Interstate 270)
  USS Indianapolis Memorial Highway around the capital of Indiana (Interstate 465)
 C-470/E-470/Northwest Parkway forms the beltway around the capital of Colorado 
 I-540/NC 540 are a partially completed loop around the capital of North Carolina

See also
 Capitol Loop
 Ring Road